The 2021–22 Coupe de France preliminary rounds, Normandy was the qualifying competition to decide which teams from the leagues of the Normandy region of France took part in the main competition from the seventh round.

A total of eight teams qualified from the Normandy preliminary rounds. In 2020–21, US Quevilly-Rouen progressed furthest in the main competition, reaching the round of 64 before losing to Red Star.

Draws and fixtures
On 15 July 2021, the league declared a total of 394 teams from the region entered the competition, with 318 entering at the first round stage and 59 at the second round stage. Eleven Championnat National 3 teams entered at the third round, two Championnat National 2 teams entered at the fourth round and one Championnat National team entered at the fifth round.

The first round draw was also published on 15 July 2021. The second round draw was published on 24 August 2021. The third round draw took place live on 6 September 2021. The fourth round draw took place on 23 September 2021. The fifth round draw was made on 7 October 2021. The sixth round draw was made on 21 October 2021.

First round
These matches were played on 22 August 2021. Tiers marked (*) are outside of the district pyramid.

Second round
These matches were played on 27 and 29 August 2021. Tiers marked (*) are outside of the district pyramid.

Third round
These matches were played on 17, 18 and 19 September 2021.

Fourth round
These matches were played on 2 and 3 October 2021, with one postponed until 10 October 2021, pending an appeal from the previous round.

Fifth round
These matches were played on 16 and 17 October 2021.

Sixth round
These matches were played on 30 and 31 October 2021.

References

preliminary rounds